Shah Jeewna (or Jewna, Jiwana, Jewana) is a town of Jhang District in the Punjab, Pakistan. it is located on the Jhang-Lalian road at 31°31'13N 72°20'21E 34 km from Jhang.

Shah Jeewna was named after Syed Mehboob Alam Naqvi-ul Bukhari Al-Maroof Shah Jewna a famous pir and missionary also descendant of Jalaluddin Surkh-Posh Bukhari. His father Syed Sadaruddin Shah Kabeer Naqvi was polyester and advisor of King Sikandar Lodi. Shah Jewna migrated from Kannauj to Shah Jeewna (a town named after him), which was deserted until he settled there. Jewna's descendants still present in various places of India and Pakistan.

References

Populated places in Jhang District
Jhang District